Fernando Cordero is the name of:

Fernando Cordero (footballer) (born 1987), Chilean footballer
Fernando Cordero Rusque (died 2020), Chilean military officer and politician
Fernando Cordero Cueva, born 1952,  Ecuadorian politician